Disappearance may refer to:

 Forced disappearance, when an organization forces a person to vanish from public view

Books
 Disappearance (Trifonov novel),  published posthumously 1987 
Disappearance, novel by Guyanese writer David Dabydeen 1993
 Disappearance (Watson novel), a young adult novel by Jude Watson
The Disappearance, a fantasy novel by Philip Wylie
 The Wide Window: or, Disappearance!, a special edition of the novel The Wide Window by Lemony Snicket

Film and television
 The Disappearance (film), a 1977 British-Canadian film directed by Stuart Cooper
 Disappearance (2002 film), an American television film directed by Walter Klenhard
 Disappearances (film), a 2006 American film directed by Jay Craven
 Disappearance (2017 Dutch film), a film directed by Boudewijn Koole
 Disappearance (2017 Iranian film), a film directed by Ali Asgari
 The Disappearance (2015 TV series), a French TV series, originally titled Disparue
 The Disappearance (2017 TV series), a Canadian TV series
 Disappearance, a 2018 Egyptian TV series starring Nelly Karim
 "Disappearance" (Dynasty), a 1984 episode of the television series Dynasty

See also
 Lists of people who disappeared
 List of missing ships
 Missing person
 Disappear (disambiguation)
 Disappeared (disambiguation)
 Disappearing (disambiguation)